Zeynel Abiddin Mosque Complex  is a historic religious building complex in Nusaybin, Mardin Province, southeastern Turkey.

The complex is named after Imam Zeynel Abidin, the fourth Imam in the Twelver and Isma'ili Shi'a Islamic approaches. Zeynel Abidin and his sister Siti Zeynep are known as 13th-generation grand children of the Prophet Muhammad. According to an inscription, the complex was built in 1159, during Zengid dynasty. It consists of a mosque, a medrese (school)  and tombs of both Zeynel Abidin and his sister Sitti Zeynep.

The building material of the L-plan mosque complex is rough stone. The mimbar, mihrab and the minaret are later additions.  The tombs of Zeynel Abidin and Siti Zeynep are located at the south east of the mosque.

World Heritage Status
This site, together with the nearby Mor Yakup Church, was added to the UNESCO World Heritage Tentative List on April 15, 2014, in the Cultural category.

References

Mosques in Turkey
12th-century mosques
Buildings and structures in Mardin Province
Islamic architecture
World Heritage Tentative List for Turkey
Nusaybin
Buildings and structures completed in 1159